Deep Impact may refer to:
 Deep Impact (film), a 1998 disaster film
 Deep Impact (horse), a Japanese racehorse
 Deep Impact (spacecraft), a NASA spacecraft launched in 2005
 "Deep Impact" (Dream Corp, LLC episode)
 "Deep Impact", a song by Dragon Ash

See also
 Impact event